Dial 999 is a 1938 British crime film directed by Lawrence Huntington and starring John Longden, Elizabeth Kent and Neville Brook. It was made as a quota quickie by 20th Century Fox at Wembley Studios. The film's title aimed to capitalize on the recent introduction of the emergency telephone number 999.

Cast
 John Longden as Bill Waring 
 Elizabeth Kent as Margot Curtis  
 Neville Brook as Hicks  
 Ian Fleming as Sir Edward Rigg  
 Paul Neville as Inspector Morris  
 Ivan Wilmot as Gelder  
 Victor Hagen  as Brandon  
 Cecil Bishop as Baker  
 Howard Douglas as Davis  
 Joe Mott as Lang  
 Paul Sheridan as Mario

References

Bibliography
 Chibnall, Steve. Quota Quickies: The Birth of the British 'B' Film. British Film Institute, 2007.
 Low, Rachael. Filmmaking in 1930s Britain. George Allen & Unwin, 1985.
 Wood, Linda. British Films, 1927-1939. British Film Institute, 1986.

External links

1938 films
Films directed by Lawrence Huntington
Quota quickies
Films shot at Wembley Studios
Films set in England
20th Century Fox films
British crime comedy films
1930s crime comedy films
British black-and-white films
1938 comedy films
1930s English-language films
1930s British films